Petro Mohyla Black Sea National University is a Ukrainian national university in Mykolaiv.

History
January 17, 1996 Mykolaiv branch of National University "Kyiv-Mohyla Academy" was founded according to the decision of NUKMA and certified by the Resolution of the Cabinet of Ministers of Ukraine (July 3, 1996).

March 13, 2002 Petro Mohyla Mykolaiv State Humanitarian University was founded on the basis of Mykolaiv branch of National University "Kyiv-Mohyla Academy" according to the Order No.112-р of the Cabinet of Ministers of Ukraine.

December 10, 2008 Petro Mohyla Mykolaiv State Humanitarian University was reorganized into Petro Mohyla Black Sea State University (Petro Mohyla BSSU) according to the Order  No.1521-р of the Cabinet of Ministers of Ukraine.

In 2009, the University joined the Great Charter of Universities and the European University Association. It is the only institution of higher education, which, in 2011, represented Ukraine and its system of teaching at the Talloires Network Leaders Conference (TNLC) of over 250 universities around the world.

On 14 June 2016, Petro Mohyla BSSU achieved the status of the national university by the Decree of the President Petro Poroshenko.

On 17 August 2022, during Russian invasion of Ukraine, the university was hit by two rockets. Two days later, Russian army shelled it with two more rockets S-300.

About University
4 institutions and 6 departments form the basis of Petro Mohyla Black Sea National University. It offers training which gives opportunity to become BA and MA in economics, law, political science, international relations, history, sociology and social work, public administration. Teaching staff prepares doctors, ecologists, programmers, linguists, psychologists, managers and other highly paid professionals.
The material base includes 11 university buildings, a library with a fund of 110,000 published sources (15 languages of the world); the information-computer center and 14 computer classes (free Wi-Fi); gyms; student dormitories etc.

There are post-graduate department in 12 specialties (theses in 9 of them could be protected in 5 specialized academic councils). Training is conducted in Ukrainian and English. Students have an opportunity to learn French, German, Spanish, Polish, Bulgarian, Korean, Chinese, Japanese, and Hebrew.

The University is recognized as the best university in Mykolayiv oblast (region) by the UNESCO international ranking "Top-100 Ukraine". On May 29, 2017, the results of "Top 200 Ukraine" (2016/2017) was published on the official site of the Center for International Projects "Yevroosvita" ("EuroEducation").  Accordingly, to the activity estimates, Petro Mohyla BSNU joined the top 50 universities in our country, ranking 44th line in the list and leading educational institutions of Mykolaiv oblast (region). In 2018, the university retains 44th position 

According to international survey PMBSNU takes high places among the best universities of Ukraine in recent years. It is unquestionable leader in the quality and quantity of academic exchange programs for students and lecturers. Many of them got diplomas and undertook apprenticeships at the best universities from France, Germany, Norway and USA. 15 scientists and lecturers of PMBSNU were awarded with diplomas and medals of Honorable international scientific community Phi Beta Delta, USA. The University has license to prepare foreign students from Armenia, Azerbaijan, Belarus, Canada, China, Columbia, Georgia, Israel, Italy, Kazakhstan, Latvia, Moldova, Russia, Turkey, Turkmenistan and Uzbekistan. Every year lectures from many countries in the world give lectures and workshops at the University. During its existence more than 100 lecturers from Australia, China, France, Germany, Japan, Italy, Lithuania, Norway, Poland, Romania, Russia, Southern Korea, Spain, Sweden, Switzerland, UK and USA have visited PMBSNU. Famous foreign diplomats, scientists and politicians are invited to give lectures. The University organizes visits and holds meetings with the Extraordinary and Plenipotentiary Ambassadors of Bulgaria, France, Germany, Norway, Poland, Switzerland.

Institutes and faculties
Institute of Philology;
Institute of Public Administration;
Medical Institute;
Teaching and Research Institute of Postgraduate Education;
Faculty of Computer Science;
Faculty of Economics;
Faculty of Law;
Faculty of Physical Education and Sport;
Faculty of Political Science;
Faculty of Sociology.

References

Official site

9.Official partner;AMCOS EDUCATION PVT LTD http://amcosedu.com/
Website; http://amcosedu.com/

Universities in Ukraine
1996 establishments in Ukraine
Educational institutions established in 1996
Buildings and structures in Mykolaiv
Institutions with the title of National in Ukraine
National universities in Ukraine